Leptostylus albicinctus is a species of longhorn beetles of the subfamily Lamiinae. It was described by Henry Walter Bates in 1885, and is known from Mexico and Costa Rica.

References

Leptostylus
Beetles described in 1885